Corpo della Gendarmeria may refer to:
Corps of Gendarmerie of Vatican City
Corps of Gendarmerie of San Marino

See also
Gendarmeria (disambiguation)